The 2003 European Junior Judo Championships is an edition of the European Junior Judo Championships, organised by the International Judo Federation. It was held in Sarajevo, Bosnia and Herzegovina from 21 to 23 November 2003.

Medal summary

Medal table

Men's events

Women's events

Source Results

References

External links
 

 U21
European Junior Judo Championships
European Championships, U21
Judo
Judo competitions in Bosnia and Herzegovina
Judo
Judo, European Championships U21